Shendur is a village in Belgaum district somewhere of Karnataka, India.

References

Villages in Belagavi district